Nordic combined at the 2023 Winter World University Games was held at the Lake Placid Olympic Ski Jumping Complex & Lake Placid Olympic Sports Complex Cross Country Biathlon Center from 13–19 January. This was the first time that the women's events were held in a World Winter World University Games.

Men's events

Women's events

Mixed events

Medal table

Participating nations

  (1)
  (1)
  (8)
  (2)
  (4)
  (3)
  (5)

References

External links
Nordic Combined lakeplacid2023.com
Results book

2023 Winter World University Games
 
2023
Winter World University Games